The Autorité des marchés financiers (AMF) is the organisation responsible for financial regulation in the Canadian province of Quebec. It regulates the province's financial markets and provides assistance to consumers of financial products and services.  As provided for under its incorporating legislation, the AMF's mission is to enforce the laws governing the regulation of the financial sector, notably in the areas of insurance, securities, deposit institutions (other than banks) and the distribution of financial products and services.

The AMF coordinates its activities with self-regulating bodies such as the Chambre des services financiers (Chamber of Financial Security) and the Chambre de l'Assurance de dommages (Chamber of Damage Insurance), including professional ethics and continuing education.

History
Established under An Act respecting the Autorité des marchés financiers on February 1, 2004, the AMF is unique by virtue of its integrated regulation of the Québec financial sector, notably in the areas of insurance, securities, deposit institutions (other than banks) and the distribution of financial products and services.

The "Autorité des marchés financiers" (Authority of financial markets) derives its authority from the "Loi sur l'Autorité des marchés financiers" (Financial Market Authority Act). It is the result of the merger of the "Commission des valeurs mobilières du Québec" (Québec Securities Commission - CVMQ), the Bureau des services financiers (Quebec) (Financial Services Bureau - BSF), the Régie de l'assurance-dépôt du Québec (Québec Deposit Insurance Corporation) (RADQ), the Fonds d'indemnisation des services financiers (Financial Services Compensation Fund) (FISF) and the "Inspecteur general des institutions financières" (Inspector General of Financial Institutions) (IGIF).

The AMF was established by the act 2002-45 of December 11, 2002 under the name of the "National Financial Sector Management Agency", in order to integrate the functions of the Bureau des services financiers (Quebec) and the Commission des valeurs mobilières du Québec (Securities Commission of Quebec), which were created by The laws bill 2002-45 of December 11, 2002- 48 of 16 December 1982.

It was then renamed under its current name by the Act 2004-37 du 17 décember 2004.

The people who have served as AMF's president and CEO are: Jean Saint-Gelais (2004-2010), Mario Albert (2010-2013), Louis Morisset (2013-today).

Responsibilities
In addition to the powers and responsibilities conferred on it by its incorporating legislation, the AMF oversees the enforcement of laws in each of the areas it regulates. It can also draw on self-regulatory organizations (SROs), to which certain regulatory powers are delegated.

The AMF is financially self-sufficient through the fees and dues paid by the persons and firms governed by the legislation it is charged with enforcing.

The AMF is headed by a President and Chief Executive Officer appointed by the government. In applying its governance rules, the AMF is supported by an Internal Auditor as well as an Advisory Board.

Other mandates of the Authority 
The "Autorité des marchés financiers" also administers the following mandates:
 Provides the required authorization for RVER (Régime volontaire d'épargne retraite) (VRSP - Voluntary Retirement Savings Plan) issuers and for companies wishing to enter into a public contract;
 Issue the required license to money service businesses;
 Gives permission to companies participating in a tendering or award process for public contracts and subcontracts;
 Seeks to implement the "Law on transparency measures in the mining, oil and gas industries";

Registries administered by the AMF 
The Authority permits public access to various registers:
 Register of individuals and businesses authorized to carry out various activities in Québec, such as insurance or administration of VRSP;
 Register of issuers subject to Québec securities;
 Register of insurers to which it grants the right to carry on insurance activities in Québec;
 Register of deposit-taking institutions: financial services cooperatives (caisses), trust companies and savings companies to which it grants the right to carry out activities in Québec;
 Register of enterprises that have been authorized to conclude public contracts and subcontracts;
 Register of legal entities authorized to act as administrator of a VRSP;
 Participatory financing portals operating under two types of plan: a registered dealer with the AMF or a participating financing scheme for start-ups.

AMF in Canada
Autorité des marchés financiers is one of two major securities regulators in Canada, the largest in Canada being the Ontario Securities Commission. The AMF regulates securities in the province of Quebec. The major exchange under its purview is the Montreal Exchange.

See also
 Autorité des marchés financiers (France)
 Securities Commission
 Canadian Securities Administrators (CSA)
 Canadian securities regulation (CSR)
 Ontario Securities Commission (OSC)
 List of financial regulatory authorities by country
 Bureau des services financiers (Quebec) (BSF)
 Chambre de la sécurité financière (Québec) (CSF)
 Chambre de l'assurance de dommages (Québec)
 Montreal Exchange (MX)

References

External links 
Autorité des marchés financiers
Site jeunesse Tes Affaires.com
Youth Web site It's Your Money

Quebec
Quebec
Economy of Quebec
Quasi-judicial bodies
Organizations based in Quebec